Alain Weill (born 7 September 1946) is a French expert in graphic design and advertising, a specialist on posters, art critic and collector.

Biography 
Alain Weill attended the École pratique des hautes études and then he studied legal science. He obtained two master's degrees: semiology and sociology of art.

As an essayist, Alain Weill has authored many books and exhibition catalogues dedicated to graphic arts and advertising posters. He is an expert in graphic arts and advertising creation, notably with the company of auctioneers. He is also a food critic, and a founding member of the Council of Culinary Arts.

He is the jury president of the European Advertising Award.

Selected publications 
 Art Nouveau Postcards: The Posterists' Postcards, Images Graphiques, 1977
 100 Years of Posters of the Folies Bergère and Music Halls of Paris, Images Graphiques, 1977
 Co-author with Jack Rennert, Alphonse Mucha: The Complete Posters and Panels, G. K. Hall & Co., 1984
 The Poster: A Worldwide Survey and History, G. K. Hall & Co., 1985
 Parisian Fashion : La Gazette du Bon Ton (1912–1925), Bibliothèque de l'Image, 2000
 Co-author with Israel Perry, Chocolate Posters, Queen Art Publishers, 2002
 Le Design graphique, collection « Découvertes Gallimard » (nº 439), série Arts. Éditions Gallimard, 2003
 US edition – Graphic Design: A History, "Abrams Discoveries" series. Harry N. Abrams, 2004
 UK edition – Graphics: A Century of Poster and Advertising Design, 'New Horizons' series. Thames & Hudson, 2004
 Masters of the Poster 1900, Posters Please, 2003
 Mirande Carnévalé-Mauzan, preface by Alain Weill – The posters of Mauzan, Square One Publishing, 2008
 The Art Nouveau Poster, Frances Lincoln Publishers, 2015
Collective work
 AA.VV., Les années 20 : L'âge des métropoles, « Livres d'Art ». Gallimard and Musée des beaux-arts de Montréal, 1991
 AA.VV., Gunter Rambow – Plakate / Posters (in German), Edition Axel Menges, 2008

References 

1946 births
French art critics
Collectors from Paris
20th-century French essayists
Officiers of the Ordre des Arts et des Lettres
Knights of the Ordre national du Mérite
École pratique des hautes études alumni
Living people